{{Taxobox
| color = lightgrey
| name = Holosporaceae
| domain = Bacteria
| phylum = Pseudomonadota
| classis = Alphaproteobacteria
| subclassis = Caulobacteridae
| ordo = Holosporales
| familia = Holosporaceae
| familia_authority = Görtz and Schmidt 2006
| subdivision_ranks = Genera
| subdivision = 
 "Candidatus Bealeia" Szokoli et al. 2016
 "Candidatus Cytomitobacter" Tashyreva et al. 2018
 "Candidatus Gortzia" Serra et al. 2016
 "Candidatus Hafkinia" Fokin et al. 2019
 "'Candidatus Hepatobacter Nunan et al. 2013
 Holospora (ex Hafkine 1890) Gromov and Ossipov 1981
 "Candidatus Hydrogenosomobacter" Takeshita et al. 2019
 "Preeria" Potekhin et al. 2018
 Pseudocaedibacter Quackenbush 1982
 Symbiotes Philip 1956 (Approved Lists 1980)
 Tectibacter (ex Preer et al. 1974) Preer and Preer 1982
}}

The Holosporaceae are a family of bacteria.  The member Holospora is an intracellular parasite found in the unicellular protozoa Paramecium.

Genome
Draft genome sequences are available for three Holospora species

and Odyssella thessalonicensis'' 

.

References

External links
 Holosporaceae J.P. Euzéby: List of Prokaryotic names with Standing in Nomenclature

Rickettsiales